Ray tracing is a method for calculating the path of waves or particles through a system. The method is practiced in two distinct forms:

Ray tracing (physics), which is used for analyzing optical and other systems
Ray tracing (graphics), which is used for 3D image generation